M. P. Shah Medical College, Jamnagar (also Shri M. P. Shah Medical College) is a medical college in Jamnagar, Gujarat, India. It is associated with the Guru Gobindsingh Hospitals, the second largest hospital complex in the state of Gujarat. The college is notable for having a solarium.

History
G.G. Hospital (the academic medical center associated with M.P. Shah Medical College) was inaugurated by Lord Irwin in 1927. In 1933, during the rule of Digvijaysinhji Ranjitsinhji Irwin Hospital was expanded, with the addition of specialty departments. Shri Abdul Karim Jamal started a dispensary opposite Irwin Hospital (A. K. Jamal Dispensary) and the Sarmatwala dispensary was started during this period. All these dispensaries including the city dispensary were merged with G.G Hospital — hence the name G.G. Hospitals.

In 1954, M. P. Shah Medical College came into existence and Irwin hospital was affiliated with it. In 2000, on the eve of the 300th birthday anniversary of Lord Guru Gobind Singh — as one of his five disciples (Punj Pyare), Mokam Singh, who got established at Bat Dwarka — Gujarat government renamed the Irwin Group of Hospitals as Guru Gobind Singh Hospital.

Dr. Dadabhai and Dr. Kalyaniwala Khandbahadur were the first heads of Irwin Group of Hospitals. Dr. Ruks Thomas (FRCS) was appointed as the first surgeon general in 1927. Dr. Pranjivan Manekchand Mehta was his successor. At the establishment of M.P. Shah Medical College in 1954,Dr.Ramniklal C. Talsania & then Dr. P. C. Rakshit took over from Dr. P. M. Mehta as the first dean and medical superintendent. At present Dr. Deepak Tiwari is medical superintendent of G.G. Hospital.

Facilities
Starting with 200 beds in 1927, the hospital has seen several major expansions. Today, it is one of the leading tertiary care and referral medical centers for the region of Saurashtra with a bed strength of 1275 (2005). The hospital has 50 indoor wards and 10 operation theaters.

Affiliations 
It is affiliated with Saurashtra University and offers the following courses:

 M.B.B.S.
 MD, General Medicine
 MD, radio diagnosis, radiology
 MD, tuberculosis and respiratory diseases, pulmonary medicine
 MD, Paediatrics
 MD/MS, obstetrics and M gynaecology
 MD/MS, ophthalmology
 MS, Ear, Nose and Throat
 MS, General Surgery
 MS, Orthopaedics
 MD, Anaesthesia

Seats

See also 
 List of medical colleges in India

References

External links 
 http://www.mpsmc.in/data/solarium.php

Medical colleges in Gujarat
Education in Jamnagar
Private medical colleges in India